Mark Parson (born May 9, 1986) is a former American football cornerback. He was released by the Edmonton Eskimos on June 3, 2012. He was signed by the Houston Texans as an undrafted free agent in 2009. Born in Chesterfield Court House, Virginia, Parson attended Monacan High School in Richmond, Virginia and the Fork Union Military Academy. He played college football at Ohio University. Mark now runs a YouTube channel where he helps high school and college cornerbacks reach their goal of making the National Football League.

Parson has also been a member of the New Orleans Saints.

External links

New Orleans Saints bio
Ohio Bobcats bio
Cornerback Guru YouTube Channel

References

1986 births
Living people
American football cornerbacks
Edmonton Elks players
Houston Texans players
New Orleans Saints players
Ohio Bobcats football players
People from Chesterfield, Virginia
Players of American football from Richmond, Virginia
Sportspeople from Richmond, Virginia
Players of Canadian football from Virginia